Robofest is an autonomous robotics competition for 4th - 12th graders.
It is similar to FIRST Lego League (FLL), but while FLL limits the student's robots to  Lego Mindstorms robots, Robofest allows the student to use any robotics system, parts, materials, or even custom electronics, in some of the events. Note that FLL students are required to use parts manufactured by Lego only, preventing the use of such aids as string or glue. Another important difference is that Robofest games have UTF (Unknown Tasks and Factors) components. Students must solve the unveiled tasks and factors within 30 minutes work-time without external help.  
Lawrence Tech's Robofest was founded by Computer Science Professor Dr. Chan-Jin Chung (or popularly known as CJ Chung) in 1999–2000 academic year and is sponsored by Lawrence Technological University and other sponsors.
LTU's Robofest is also held internationally, in countries including
Brazil, Canada, China, Colombia, Ecuador, Egypt, Ethiopia, England, France, Ghana, Greece, Hong Kong, Hungary, India, Kenya, Lebanon, Macau, Malawi, Mexico, Morocco, Nigeria, Philippines, Saudi Arabia, Singapore, South Africa, South Korea, Taiwan, and UAE.
Teams who win their regional event are welcome to participate at the worldwide tournament held at Lawrence Technological University in Michigan. ROBOFEST is a registered trademark of Lawrence Technological University
in the US and other countries.

Mission statement
Robofest's mission is (1) to generate excitement and interest among young people for Science, Technology, Engineering, and Mathematics (STEM), Art, and Computer Science; (2) to develop problem solving skills as well as teamwork, creative thinking, and communication skills; and (3) to prepare them to excel in higher education and technological careers. Evaluation and assessment results show that Robofest is achieving these missions.

Competition categories
There are a total of eight different competition categories in Robofest.

 Game Competition - Students compete with two robots to work together autonomously to complete the given missions. The missions change per year, and an "unknown challenge" must be adapted to on the competition day.
 Exhibition - Robotic contraptions to do the designers task.
 Vision Centric Challenge (Vcc, formerly Mini Urban Challenge) - Robots drive along a realistic road, stopping at "traffic lights" drawn on the road.
 RoboArts - (Formerly GRAF). Robotic Music, Fashion & Dance, Robotic Painting, and Interactive Kinetic Sculptures
 UMC (Unknown Mission Challenge) - Mission tasks will be totally unknown until the day of competition
 BottleSumo - Robots compete to either push a bottle or the other robot off of a table.
 RoboParade - A parade of autonomous robotic floats
 RoboMed - High School and College teams create intelligent and interactive medical robotics/device projects

Retired competition categories include:
 Robosumo - Competing robots attempt to push each other out of the ring.
 VEX Pentathlon - VEX robots compete in five events.
 RoboFashion and Dance Show - Costumed robots present themselves on a track.
 VEX Bridge Battle - Two VEX robots compete on a bridge.

Competition age divisions
Junior: (4th or) 5th-8th graders can compete with an easier unknown tasks and factors
Senior: 9th-12th graders can compete with a somewhat harder unknown tasks and factors
Collegiate: College students can compete in RoboMed Challenge.

TV and newspaper articles

 PBS Detroit Public TV Robofest 2013 (27 minutes)
 PBS WUCF Florida, SCITECH NOW: Robofest in Tampa, Florida, Aired Sep. 2, 2015 (7m 17s)
 PBS WEDU QUEST: Robofest International, Aired June. 15 2017 (7m 44s)
 CNN London - Teaching kids robotics in Ghana, Ghana Robotics Academy Foundation: Robofest Partner in Ghana, aired on Feb 1 ~ 4, 2020
 ABC WXYZ-TV Detroit Channel 7: Robofest World Championship 2016
 NBC Detroit Channel 4: Robofest 2016
 USA Today, Apr 6, 2017, Robofest promotes STEM learning
 Ebony, May 28, 2019, All-Girls Robotic Team From Ghana Wins World Robofest Championship
 Detroit Free Press, May 13, 2017, Robofest at Lawrence Tech draws school-age engineers and their self-driving machines by JC Reindl
 The Oakland Press, May 15, 2019, Robofest robotics competition draws students from all over world to Lawrence Tech
 CBS Detroit, May 8, 2012, Robofest World Championship Coming To Lawrence Tech May 19

Directors
 Christopher Cartwright, 2021-
 Chan-Jin Chung, 1999-2020

Notable alumni
 Joshua E. Siegel
 Sang Hun Oh

Other Robofests
The word RoboFest was used for a robot event by the Robot Group of Austin, Texas,  at least as early as 1989. The Robot Group had a yearly RoboFest through the 1990s. There are various other Robofests not connected to Lawrence Tech's Robofest:
Russia

Hawaii

Sri Lanka Institute of Information Technology

References

External links
 
 Official Facebook page

Lego themes
Robotics competitions